Gal Beckerman is an American writer and senior editor at The Atlantic. He wrote articles on Ukraine-Russia conflict, social justice in America, and the 2022 attack on Salman Rushdie. Previously, he was an editor for the New York Times Book Review.

Beckerman earned a Media Studies PhD from Columbia University with a 2021 thesis On the Incubation of Radical Ideas: A Communications History.  His thesis advisors were Todd Gitlin and Michael Schudson.

Beckerman, his wife and two daughters live in Brooklyn.

Works 

 When They Come for Us, We’ll Be Gone, Houghton Mifflin Harcourt, Boston, 2010. 
 The Quiet Before: On the Unexpected Origins of Radical Ideas. Crown, New York, 2022.

References

External links 
http://www.galbeckerman.com/

Living people
Year of birth missing (living people)
American magazine editors
Biography articles needing attention
The Atlantic (magazine) people
The New York Times people
21st-century American non-fiction writers
21st-century American male writers
Columbia University alumni
Writers from Brooklyn